Kathryn Parker Almanas is a photographer best known for appearing on Bravo's Work of Art: The Next Great Artist.

Life
Almanas graduated from Yale University's Master of Fine Arts program in 2007. 
Her work is inspired by Dutch Golden Age painting and the Age of Enlightenment. She has Crohn's disease.

Exhibitions
The Intimate Collection, Yellow Peril Gallery, Providence, RI, 2016

References

External links
 Official website

Living people
Yale School of Art alumni
American photographers
Year of birth missing (living people)